Lyudmila Grudeva Andonova (née Zhecheva; born 6 May 1960) is a retired high jumper from Bulgaria. In 1984, she broke the World Record with a clearance of 2.07 metres. She competed at the 1988 Olympic Games in Seoul  and the 1992 Olympic Games in Barcelona.

Biography
She set the women's world record in the high jump event on July 20, 1984 in East Berlin, jumping 2.07 metres.

In 1985 she was suspended for doping with amphetamine.

Andonova competed at the 1988 Summer Olympics in Seoul, South Korea, finishing in fifth place (1.93 m) alongside Romania's Galina Astafei. She was born in Novocherkassk, Soviet Union, and married to Bulgarian decathlete Atanas Andonov.

International competitions
 All results regarding high jump

See also
Female two metres club

References

1960 births
Living people
Bulgarian female high jumpers
Doping cases in athletics
Athletes (track and field) at the 1988 Summer Olympics
Athletes (track and field) at the 1992 Summer Olympics
Olympic athletes of Bulgaria
World record setters in athletics (track and field)
People from Novocherkassk
Universiade medalists in athletics (track and field)
Universiade silver medalists for Bulgaria
Medalists at the 1981 Summer Universiade
Friendship Games medalists in athletics